Diplasterias brucei is a species of starfish in the family Asteriidae. It is found in the Pacific Ocean and Southern Ocean. It is a predator and scavenger and is unusual among starfish in that it broods its young.

Description
D. brucei usually has five arms, but in the vicinity of South Georgia, a six-armed form is common. This starfish varies in colour from a pale bluish-green to a yellowish or orange hue.

Distribution
D. brucei is found in the Pacific Ocean and Southern Ocean.

Ecology
This zone is characterised by a layer of sponge spicules and dead mollusc shells a metre or more thick, swathed in living sponges. This matrix is a biodiverse environment rich in sea anemones, polychaete worms, hydroids, bryozoans and molluscs. The bivalve mollusc Limatula hodgsoni is particularly common and there are also great quantities of tiny  gastropod molluscs in the genera Onoba and Margarella.

The starfishes Acodontaster conspicuus, Acodontaster hodgsoni, Odontaster meridionalis and Perknaster fuscus feed on the sponges, while Odontaster validus mostly scavenges, and D. brucei and the gastropod Trophonella longstaffi both feed on the bivalve L. hodgsoni. D. brucei primarily feeds on molluscs, but does not seem to eat sponges as do many other starfish. It is sometimes preyed on by the sea anemone Urticinopsis antarctica. Developing embryos of this species are brooded by the female until they have developed into juvenile starfish.

The starfish O. validus is an omnivorous predator and scavenger in Antarctic waters, a keystone species feeding on almost anything organic with which it comes in contact, including other species of starfish. However, O validus avoids the brooded embryos of D. brucei, which contain secondary metabolites which act as a deterrent. This is of importance in a species that takes a long time to develop in the cold waters which it inhabits.

References

Asteriidae
Animals described in 1908